This is a list of Spanish words of Italian origin.  It is further divided into words that come from contemporary Italian and from  colloquial Italian in Spanish.  Some of these words have alternate etymologies and may also appear on a list of Spanish words borrowed from a different language.

Italian 

Since the Middle Ages the Italian Maritime Republics (mainly the Republic of Genova) have influenced the Spanish language. But the biggest borrowings happened during the Italian Renaissance centuries. The following is a small list of these borrowings:

 alarme (all'arme) – en.: alarm
 alerta (all'erta) – en.: alert
 andante (andante)
 antepasto (antipasto)
 arcada (arcate) – en.: arcade
 ária (aria)
 aquarelo (acquarella) – en.: watercolour
 atarantar
 arpegio (arpeggio)
 azufre
 bajo
 balcón
 balón
 banquete (banchetto) – en.: banquet
 barista (barista)
 batallon (battaglione) – en.: battalion
 batuta (battuta)
 belvedere (belvedere)
 boletin (bollettino) – en.: bulletin
 bravada (bravata)
 birra (birra) – en.: beer
 brújula
 cantata (cantata)
 capitán (capitano) – .en: captain
 capricho (capriccio)
 capuchino (cappuccino)
 caricatura (caricatura)
 carnaval (carnevale) – en.: carnival
 centinela
 chelo
 charlar
 charlatan
 commando
 comparsa
 contrabando
 cúpula
 daga
 escorzo
 espagueti
 estropear
 fachada
 fiesta (festa) – en.: fest, party
 fiasco (fare fiasco) – en.: fiasco
 fragata (fregata) – en.: frigate
 galeria (galleria) – en.: wikt:gallery
 gazetin (gazzetta) – en.: gazette
 girafa (giraffa) – en.: giraffe
 gondola (gondola)
 grafito (graffiti)
 granito (granito) – en.: granite
 grotesco (grottesco) – en.: grotesque
 grupo (gruppo) – en.: group
 gueto (ghetto)
 laburar
 lasaña
 lava
 miniatura (miniatura) – en.: miniature
 modelo (modello) – en.: model
 millón
 mufa
 niña (nonna) Grandma or girl
 ñoqui
 novella
 opera
 pavana
 piano
 pizza
 porcelana (porcellana) – en.: porcelain
 radio
 remolacha
 sémola
 sentinela (sentinella) – en.: sentinel
 serenata (serenata)
 sinfonia (sinfonia) – en.: symphony
 solfejo (solfeggio)
 solo (solo)
 sonata (sonata)
 soneto (sonneto) = en.: sonnet
 soprano (soprano)
 tenor (tenore) – en.: tenor
 terracota (terracotta)
 tombola (tombola)
 torso (torso)
 trampolim (trampolino) – en.: trampoline
 travertino (travertino) – en.: travertine
 truco (trucco)
 tutifrúti (tutti-frutti)
 viola (viola)
 violino (violino)
 violoncelo (violoncello)
 zero (zero)

Colloquial Italian-Spanish 

The Italian emigrants in Argentina, Uruguay, Venezuela, Colombia, and Ecuador have enriched the local Spanish language. In countries like Argentina and Uruguay they even created their own dialects, like the Cocoliche and the Lunfardo. Indeed the "lunfardo" word comes from a deformation of "lombardo", an Italian dialect (from Lombardia) spoken by northern Italian emigrants to the Buenos Aires region. Other local dialects in Latinoamerica created by the Italian emigrants are the Talian dialect in Brasil and the Chipilo dialect in Mexico.

The following is a small list:

Anchoa (Italian dialect -Genoese- ancioa)
Birra. Beer. From "Birra".
Calarse. To digest (or sustain) something bad. From "Calarsi" with the same meaning.
Chao. Friendly salute. From "Ciao" (English: Hi).
Contorno. Side dish. From "Contorno".
Fiaca. (Buenos Aires Lunfardo) Laziness, or lazy person (from the Italian fiacca "laziness, sluggishness")
Fungi (Argentinian Cocoliche). Mushroom. From "Fungo"
Gafo. Stupid. From "Cafone" (low class peasant).
Laburar (Rioplatense Spanish), from Italian lavorare, = "to work"
Mafioso. Criminal. From "Mafioso".
Milanesa. Food. From "Milanese" (a food made with meat and bread).
Mina. (Buenos Aires Lunfardo), an informal word for woman (from Lombard dialect)
Mortadela. Food. From "Mortadella" (a food made from pork and chicken)
Mufa (Rioplatense Spanish) = "bad luck", from Italian muffa (mildew)
Pasticho. From "pasticcio" (a lasagna).
Pibe (Rioplatense Spanish), from Italian dialect pive ("piccino")
Salute (Argentinian Cocoliche). Greetings. From "Saluti"
Terraza. Balcony. From "Terrazza".

See also 
Linguistic history of Spanish
List of Spanish words of French origin
List of Portuguese words of Italian origin
List of English words of Spanish origin
Cocoliche
Lunfardo

References 
"Breve diccionario etimológico de la lengua española" by Guido Gómez de Silva

Italian
Spanish